William Caldwell Roscoe (1823–1859) was an English journalist and poet.

Life
Born at Liverpool on 20 September 1823, he was son of William Stanley Roscoe and grandson of William Roscoe; his mother Hannah Eliza Caldwell, was daughter of James Caldwell of Linley Wood in Staffordshire, and a sister of Anne Marsh-Caldwell. He was educated at a private school, St. Domingo House, near Liverpool, and then at University College, London, graduating in the University of London in 1843.

Roscoe was called to the bar in 1850, but after two years relinquished practice, partly for health reasons, but also from doubts of his qualifications for his profession. He married, and then lived mostly in Wales, where he was interested in slate quarries and spent time writing. He died at Richmond, Surrey of typhoid fever, on 30 July 1859.

Works
Roscoe published two tragedies, Eliduc (1846) and Violenzia (1851, anon.), and much verse. As a journalist he had numerous essays in the Prospective Review, and the National Review, of which his brother-in-law Richard Holt Hutton was editor. These compositions were collected and published in 1860 by Hutton, with a memoir; the poems and dramas were republished in 1891 by his daughter, Elizabeth Mary Roscoe.

Family
Roscoe married in 1855 Emily, daughter of William Malin of Derby.

Notes

Attribution

William Caldwell Roscoe page on the JJ Heath-Caldwell family history website

1823 births
1859 deaths
English barristers
English male journalists
19th-century British journalists
English male dramatists and playwrights
English male poets
19th-century English poets
19th-century English dramatists and playwrights
19th-century English male writers
19th-century English lawyers